Verona Villegas (born 11 February 1998) is a Venezuelan recurve archer.

Villegas  represented her country at the 2015 Pan American Games. She competed in the individual recurve event and the team recurve event at the 2015 World Archery Championships in Copenhagen, Denmark.

References

External links

sports.inquirer.net
archeryeurope.org

Venezuelan female archers
Living people
Place of birth missing (living people)
1998 births
Archers at the 2015 Pan American Games
Pan American Games competitors for Venezuela
Archers at the 2014 Summer Youth Olympics
21st-century Venezuelan women